Kevin Dotson may refer to:

Linus of Hollywood (born 1973), American singer
Kevin Dotson (American football) (born 1996), American football offensive lineman